Helen Joyce is an Irish journalist, currently director of advocacy for campaign group Sex Matters. She studied as a mathematician and worked in academia before switching to journalism. Joyce began working for The Economist as education correspondent for its Britain section in 2005 and has since held several senior positions, including finance editor and international editor. She published her book Trans: When Ideology Meets Reality in 2021.

Early life and education 
She was born in 1968 in Dublin, Ireland, and moved to Bray, County Wicklow at age 8. She's the oldest of nine children of James "Jimmy" and Maureen Joyce, five boys and four girls. Five of her younger siblings — Gus, Ed, Dominick, Isobel, and Cecelia Joyce — have played international cricket for Ireland, while Ed has also played for the England test side. Brothers Johnny and Damian played club cricket. Johnny is an international chess player.

Joyce moved to England at age 16 to attend musical theatre college, but dropped out after two years. In 1987, she enrolled at Trinity College Dublin, where she was elected a Scholar in 1989, and received a BA in mathematics in 1991. She next completed Part III of the Mathematical Tripos with distinction at the University of Cambridge, earning a scholarship from the British Council and a PhD place at University College London. She got a PhD in geometric measure theory at University College London (1995) with the dissertation "Packing measures, packing dimensions, and the existence of sets of positive finite measure" under David Preiss. She then took a postdoctoral position in Cardiff, and spent two years at Finland's University of Jyväskylä on a Marie Curie research fellowship funded by the European Union.

Career
Returning to University College London to work on a project run by the geology department, Joyce became interested in what she later described as the "business of telling non-mathematicians about maths."

In 2000 she joined the newly launched Millennium Mathematics Project (MMP) at the University of Cambridge promoting mathematics education in schools and other venues. For two years she worked on an MMP project which enabled mathematicians to interact directly with schools using video. In 2002 she was named editor of the project's online Plus Magazine, a position she held for three years. In 2004 she also became founding editor for the Royal Statistical Society's quarterly magazine Significance, with the aim to demonstrate in an entertaining and thought-provoking way the practical use of statistics and to show how they are of benefit to people in all walks of life.

In 2005 Joyce became education correspondent for The Economist. Four years later she transferred to the newspaper's project exploring how to best present statistics to readers. In August 2010 she moved to São Paulo to become The Economist′s Brazil bureau chief, a position she held through 2013. Returning to London she served as The Economist′s finance editor and international editor and in March 2020 became its executive editor for events business.

In 2022, she took a one year unpaid sabbatical from The Economist and became director of advocacy for Sex Matters. In January 2023 she decided to stay at Sex Matters rather than return to The Economist. She explained this decision saying, "If I wanted to go back [to journalism], I would really have had to stop doing [campaign work]... It's only escalating and escalating, and just in good conscience I didn't feel I could go back."

Views on transgender topics
In July 2018, Joyce curated a series of articles on transgender identity in The Economist.

GLAAD described Joyce's December 2018 article "The New Patriarchy: How Trans Radicalism Hurts Women, Children—and Trans People Themselves" for Quillette as 'alarming' stating they have "no place in a newsroom". Joyce responded that the organization had been "co-opted by [GLAAD board member] Anthony Watson to continue his unprovoked attacks against me".

In March 2019 The Daily Dot reported that Joyce "claimed, among other things, that the trans rights movement is enabling sexual predators... referred to puberty blockers or other treatments that affirm a trans child’s sense of self as 'sickening'... [and] also called these procedures 'child abuse,' 'unethical medicine,' 'mass experimentation,' and a 'global scandal'".

In June 2022 PinkNews reported that Joyce had spoken in favour of "reducing or keeping down the number of people who transition" and that "every one of those people is a person who's been damaged" and "every one of those people is basically, you know, a huge problem to a sane world".

Trans: When Ideology Meets Reality
In July 2021, Joyce's book Trans: When Ideology Meets Reality, was published by Oneworld Publications. The book sold well, debuting within a week of its publication at number 7 on The Sunday Times list of bestselling general hardbacks and remaining in the top 10 for a second week. It was named as one of the year's best books by The Times. The book received other positive reviews in the Evening Standard, New Statesman, and The Scotsman.

The Times regular columnist David Aaronovitch wrote that "Joyce [examines] a new ideology about gender. This holds that biological sex is as much a 'social construct' as the idea of gender is. One benefit of Joyce's book is its intellectual clarity and its refusal to compromise. So she takes apart this ideology of gender with a cold rigour."

Kathleen Stock, then a professor of philosophy at the University of Sussex and author of Material Girls: Why Reality Matters for Feminism (2021), gave Trans a 5-star review at The Telegraph, calling it a "superlative critical analysis of trans activism" and that "Joyce shows an impressive capacity to handle complex statistics, legal statutes, and other bits of evidence without losing clarity or narrative drive."

The Guardian gave it a mixed review. A review at Publishers Weekly criticized the book as "alarmist" and a "one-sided takedown" that "comes up short."

Aaron Rabinowitz, writing for The Skeptic, criticized Joyce for her mirroring activist Jennifer Bilek's ideas and accused Joyce of incorporating her antisemitic canards in her work, by claiming that George Soros and other Jewish billionaires are the transhumanist shapers of a global agenda behind the transgender rights movement, through financial contributions to organizations such as Planned Parenthood and the American Civil Liberties Union. Joyce published a rebuttal to these allegations, writing that she had been "subjected to a smear campaign... because that’s what happens to anyone who publicly dissents from gender-identity ideology—the notion that what makes you a man or woman isn’t your immutable biology, but what you declare yourself to be." She rejected accusations of antisemitism, saying "I didn’t deliberately select three Jewish donors; it never occurred to me to think about their religions. Two of the three, it turns out, are indeed Jewish, though that is not something I mention in my book because it is utterly irrelevant." Joyce denied plagiarism, denounced Bilek for antisemitism and reiterated the thesis of her book. She also corrected a claim about a donation made by Open Society Foundation; the donation was to a similarly named group which also advocated for gender self-identification.

Talks
In March 2022 Joyce was due to appear in a panel to discuss her book and views on gender theory. This panel would have been part of an event for an expected 100 to 150 trainee child psychiatrists organised by Great Ormond Street Hospital and Health Education England. Before the event the organisers received allegations against Joyce and were warned "There is no possible way in which this event can possibly be a 'safe environment’ for LGBTQ+ and especially trans participants". Joyce was disinvited days before the event, which was later postponed. Joyce said, "It's outrageous that a journalist who has written a best-selling book spelling out the harms of this bizarre, evidence-free ideology is no-platformed and subjected to a smear campaign."

In October 2022, Joyce participated in an interview with economist Partha Dasgupta at Gonville and Caius College, Cambridge. Philosopher Arif Ahmed hosted the event, titled "Criticising gender-identity ideology: what happens when speech is silenced". Protestors chanted "trans rights are human rights" and banged drums outside the event. The college master Pippa Rogerson and senior tutor Andrew Spencer boycotted the event and described Joyce's views as "polemics". In response, Joyce published an open letter entitled "Has Cambridge abandoned debate?" in The Spectator.

Personal life 
Joyce lives in Cambridge with her husband and two sons. She had unexplained infertility and used IVF to conceive them.

Joyce was raised Irish Catholic, but is now an avowed atheist.

References

External links 
 Official website
 

Living people
Alumni of Trinity College Dublin
Alumni of the University of Cambridge
Alumni of University College London
British business and financial journalists
British women journalists
Irish women journalists
Women business and financial journalists
The Economist people
Feminism and transgender
People from Bray, County Wicklow
Helen
1968 births